Yu 3002 was an Imperial Japanese Army transport submarine, a unit of the Yu 3001 subclass of the Yu I type. Constructed for use during World War II, she served in the waters of the Japanese archipelago and was lost in a storm in 1945.

Construction
In the final two years of World War II, the Imperial Japanese Army constructed transport submarines — officially the Type 3 submergence transport vehicle and known to the Japanese Army as the Maru Yu — with which to supply its isolated island garrisons in the Pacific. Only submarines of the Yu I type were completed and saw service. The Yu I type was produced in four subclasses, each produced by a different manufacturer and differing primarily in the design of their conning towers and details of their gun armament. None carried torpedoes or had torpedo tubes. Yu 3002 was a unit of the Yu 3001 subclass.

The Korea Machine Factory Boat Manufacturing Works (Chosen Kikan Seisakujo Jinsen Kojo Seizotai) constructed Yu 3002 at Inchon in Chosen, the Japanese name for Korea while Korea was under Japanese rule. Records of the details of the construction of Yu 3002 have not been discovered, but the lead unit of her subclass, her sister ship , entered service in August 1944.

One source claims the North Korea Machine Works (Kikai Seisakujo) at Wonsan, Korea, built all submarines of the Yu 3001 subclass.

Service history
Yu 3002 spent her operational career in Japanese home waters. Surviving records of the activities of Imperial Japanese Army submarines are fragmentary, and no records have been discovered describing her specific activities in support of any particular operation. She sank in a storm sometime in 1945.

References

Footnotes

Bibliography
 

 
Rekishi Gunzō, History of Pacific War Extra, Perfect guide, The submarines of the Imperial Japanese Forces, Gakken, Tokyo Japan, 2005, .
Rekishi Gunzō, History of Pacific War Vol.45, Truth histories of the Imperial Japanese Naval Vessels, Gakken, Tokyo Japan, 2004, .
Ships of the World No.506, Kaijinsha, Tokyo Japan, 1996.
The Maru Special, Japanese Naval Vessels No.43 Japanese Submarines III, Ushio Shobō, Tokyo Japan, 1980.
Atsumi Nakashima, Army Submarine Fleet, "The secret project !, The men challenged the deep sea", Shinjinbutsu Ōraisha, Tokyo Japan, 2006, .
50 year history of the Japan Steel Works (first volume and second volume), Japan Steel Works, 1968.

1940s ships
Ships built in South Korea
Submarines of the Imperial Japanese Army
World War II submarines of Japan
Maritime incidents in 1945
Lost submarines of Japan
Shipwrecks of Japan